The Knight Kadosh is a Freemasonic degree or ceremony of initiation performed by certain branches of the Ancient and Accepted Scottish Rite of Freemasonry (or simply, "Scottish Rite"). It is the Thirtieth Degree of the Southern Jurisdiction of the Scottish Rite for the United States of America, and the Ancient and Accepted Scottish Rite of Freemasonry of Canada.  The Northern Masonic Jurisdiction of the Scottish Rite, does not confer a degree entitled "Knight Kadosh." Instead its thirtieth degree is entitled "Grand Inspector."

The term "Kadosh" is derived from the Hebrew word "קדוש", which means holy or consecrated.  "Kadosh" and "Knight Kadosh" is often abbreviated in masonic documents as "K--H∴" and "K∴K∴D∴H".

History
The earliest recorded portrayal of the "Knight Kadosh" degree can be linked to the Council of Emperors of the East and West in 1758.  This council united several Masonic degrees being conducted in eighteenth-century Paris, France.  The "Knight Kadosh," or originally "Illustrious and Grand Commander of the White and Black Eagle, Grand Elect Kadosh," was part of a full complement of twenty-five degrees or grades governed by this council.  The "Knight Kadosh" was the twenty-fourth degree of this complement.

In 1801, the first and oldest Supreme Council of the Scottish Rite was founded in Charleston, South Carolina. This body adopted many of the degrees of the Council of Emperors of the East and West, including that of "Knight Kadosh." The "Knight Kadosh" degree was adopted as the thirtieth degree and was simply titled "Knight Kadosh."  The degree received a substantial re-write in the 1850s when Albert Pike was Grand Commander of the Southern Jurisdiction of the United States.  It was further revised in 2000.

A different form of the Knight Kadosh degree, using a ritual not authored by Pike, was for many years performed in the Northern Masonic Jurisdiction of the United States, headquartered at Lexington, Massachusetts.  However, that body no longer performs the degree.

Lesson of the Degree
Like all Masonic Degrees, the Knight Kadosh Degree attempts to teach the initiates a series of moral lessons by the use of allegory and symbolism.  The official description of the lesson portrayed in Southern Jurisdiction of the Scottish Rite for the United States of America's version of the Knight Kadosh Degree is as follows
"The lesson of this degree is to be true to ourselves, to stand for what is right and just in our lives today. To believe in God, country and ourselves."

Controversy
The Knight Kadosh degree is occasionally accused of being anti-Catholic.  The 1918 edition of the Catholic Encyclopedia stated that, in the ceremony in use in the Southern Jurisdiction of the Ancient and Accepted Scottish Rite in the United States, purported to have been written by Albert Pike, the Papal tiara is trampled during the initiation.  This allegation does not appear in any subsequent editions of the Catholic Encyclopedia, although it was repeated by Father William Saunders in the Arlington Catholic Herald in 1996.

Neither the Catholic Encyclopedia's nor Father Saunders' account agrees with Pike's earliest version of the ritual, which includes neither trampling or stabbing a skull and no mention of papal tiaras at all. However, this earliest Pike revision of the Scottish Rite degree rituals, publicly available as "The Magnum Opus or Great Work," was not adopted by the Rite's Supreme Council for the Southern Jurisdiction of the United States and thus was never practiced in that jurisdiction or any other Scottish Rite jurisdiction recognized by it. Whether these elements are included in the current official version of the ritual or in earlier official versions is not disclosed to non-members.

Pike's book Morals and Dogma of the Ancient and Accepted Scottish Rite of Freemasonry does mention hostility to the papal tiara by the historical Knights Templar when discussing the Kadosh degree; however, this is Pike's commentary on the degree and is not part of the degree itself.

References

Catholicism and Freemasonry